Eupithecia transexpiata is a moth in the family Geometridae. It is found in the Los Lagos Region (Osomo Province) in Chile. The habitat consists of the Valdivian Forest Biotic Province.

The length of the forewings is about 8.5 mm for males. The forewings are whitish, with brownish black areas of scales along the median area of the costa and below the apex on the outer margin. The hindwings have the same colour as the forewing, but with an increasing number of pale greyish brown scales distally. Adults have been recorded on wing in February.

Etymology
The specific name consists of the Latin prefix trans- and Latin expiata and suggest a
relationship with the related species Eupithecia inexpiata.

References

Moths described in 1987
transexpiata
Moths of South America
Endemic fauna of Chile